6344 P-L is an unnumbered, sub-kilometer asteroid and suspected dormant comet, classified as near-Earth object and potentially hazardous asteroid of the Apollo group that was first observed on 24 September 1960, by astronomers and asteroid searchers Tom Gehrels, Ingrid van Houten-Groeneveld, and Cornelis Johannes van Houten during the Palomar–Leiden survey at Palomar Observatory.

Description 

Since  is still unnumbered, the discoverers have not yet been officially determined. In other words, it was a lost asteroid from 1960 until it was recovered and recognized as the same object by Peter Jenniskens in 2007. It was again observed from 19 July 2021 to 4 August 2021 by Astronomical Research Observatory, Westfield, and Calar Alto-Schmidt (see Minor Planet Center MPS 1525704). 

It is either an asteroid or dormant comet nucleus, and it has a 4.7-year orbit around the Sun. The orbit goes out as far as Jupiter's but then back in, passing as close as 0.07 AU to the Earth, making it a collision risk.

Close approaches 

Although it was not outgassing at the time of its recovery, its orbit indicates that it is probably a dormant comet.

Physical characteristics 

Based on a generic magnitude-to-diameter conversion,  measures between 250 and 460 meters for an assumed albedo between 0.20 and 0.06. As of 2018, no rotational lightcurve has been obtained. The body's rotation period, shape and pole remains unknown.

Palomar–Leiden survey 

The survey designation "P-L" stands for Palomar–Leiden, named after Palomar Observatory and Leiden Observatory, which collaborated on the fruitful Palomar–Leiden survey in the 1960s. Tom Gehrels used Palomar's 48-inch Samuel Oschin telescope and shipped the photographic plates to the van Houten's at Leiden Observatory, where astrometry was carried out. The trio are credited with more than 4600 minor planet discoveries.

Numbering and naming 

As of 2021, this minor planet has neither been numbered nor named and still remains provisionally designated (see list of unnumbered minor planets).

References

External links 
 
 
 

6344

19600924